Brian Verdon McCleary (17 January 1897 – 2 July 1978) was a New Zealand rugby union player and boxer. He was a member of the All Blacks in 1924 and 1925, playing in the hooker position. He was also a New Zealand and Australasian amateur and professional light-heavyweight and heavyweight boxing champion.

Early life
McCleary was born in Dunedin and was educated at Christian Brothers School where he played rugby.

Rugby union

McCleary played for the Christchurch Marist club  and then the Culverden club and represented Canterbury in 1920 and 1923. He represented the South Island in 1923 and 1924 and was a New Zealand trialist in 1924. He was selected for the All Blacks in 1923 and 1925. He played in Australia and at home for New Zealand  before the Invincibles tour, on which he played in nine games. In all he played twelve games for the All Blacks. All his matches for New Zealand were against regional or representative clubs never playing at international level.

Boxing
McCleary began his boxing career as an orthodox heavyweight. After an unbeaten amateur record of 32 fights he turned professional.

On 15 April 1922, McCleary challenged Cyril Whittaker for the vacant New Zealand heavyweight title at King Edward's Barracks in Christchurch. The contest went the full fifteen rounds with McCleary winning by points decision, making him the heavyweight champion. He successfully defended his title in May 1922 against Albert Pooley, while a June challenge from Paul McQuarie ended in a no contest. On 9 September 1922, McCleary faced Cyril Whittaker again, when both men dropped a weight to contest the vacant light-heavyweight title. McCleary beat Whittaker again on points, giving him his second New Zealand boxing champion title. He successfully defended his title in May 1923, stopping Laurie Cadman by technical knockout in the seventh round; but lost his title a month later when he lost by points to Eddie Parker. 

14 August 1923 saw McCleary face his most notable opponent, Tom Heeney, in a challenge for his heavyweight title. McCleary was beaten by technical knockout in the fourteenth round, losing his title to Heeney who would go on to challenge NBA World heavyweight champion Gene Tunney in New York. McCleary challenged for the New Zealand light-heavyweight belt again in 1924, but lost by decision, again to Eddie Parker.

Death
He died 2 July 1978, aged 81, in Martinborough, and was buried at Martinborough Cemetery.

References

External links

 Article from 2011 in the Dominion Post including a photo

1897 births
1978 deaths
New Zealand international rugby union players
New Zealand rugby union players
People educated at Trinity Catholic College, Dunedin
New Zealand professional boxing champions
Light-heavyweight boxers
Rugby union players from Dunedin
Sportspeople from Dunedin
People from Martinborough
Heavyweight boxers
New Zealand people of Irish descent
New Zealand male boxers
Canterbury rugby union players
Rugby union hookers